Hang Dong Canyon, also known as Chiang Mai Grand Canyon, is located in Soi Ban Rai 3 Mu 1, Nam Phrae, Hang Dong District, Chiang Mai Province, in the northern part of Thailand. Hang Dong Canyon is considered a tourist attraction in Chiang Mai.

History 
Hang Dong Canyon used to be an abandoned field and was accidentally created by Mr. Chatkarin Trakulinsan, the land owner.

Climate

Hang Dong Canyon has a tropical wet and dry climate year-round. The temperature at night is lower than in the day. There are three season in Thailand:
 A hot season (Feb to Jun)
 A wet season (Jun to Oct)
 A cool season (Oct to Jan)

References

 2051638, ส. (2015, March 9). Retrieved September 27, 2016, from http://pantip.com: http://pantip.com/topic/33326446
 reviewchiangmai. (2013, June 27). Retrieved September 27, 2016, from https://www.reviewchiangmai.com: https://www.reviewchiangmai.com/1730-p/
 Spurrell, M. (2016, March 18). Retrieved October 5, 2016, from http://www.mekongtourism.org: http://www.mekongtourism.org/welcome-to-the-grand-canyon-in-chiang-mai-thailand/

Canyons and gorges of Asia
Geography of Chiang Mai province
Tourist attractions in Chiang Mai province
Landforms of Thailand